Niels Valdemarsen, Count of Halland, Nikolaus, (died 1218) was Count of Halland from 1216 until his death in 1218. He was a natural son of King Valdemar II of Denmark by an unknown mistress.

In 1217, Niels married Oda of Schwerin, a daughter of Gunzelin I, Count of Schwerin. As a result of the marriage, half the county of Schwerin was pledged as security to Niels until her dowry could be paid.

He had a son Niels Nielsen Skarsholm af Halland (1215-1260) who married Cecilie Jensdatter Galen 1215-1260. They had a son Jacob Nielsen Skarsholm af Halland 1250-1308. The family line would many generations later result in the birth of important noble man Henning Jørgensen Gagge (1502 - 1562)

Niels died already in 1218, his widow in 1220. They were survived by a son, Niels, Count of Northern Halland. Disputes over his claims to the German territories pledged to his father, led to the capture of his grandfather Valdemar II in 1223 by Henry, Count of Schwerin.

Bibliography
Johannes Steenstrup: "Niels, Greve af Halland", Dansk biografisk leksikon, XII. Bind. Münch-Peirup, 1898, p. 202.

Year of birth unknown
1218 deaths
People from Halland
House of Estridsen
Illegitimate children of Danish monarchs
Halland
Sons of kings